The Grand Mosque in Asilah, Morocco, is the main mosque of the historic royal citadel (kasbah) in the old city (medina) of Asilah. It was built under Moulay Ismail in the late 17th century.

History 
The Grand Mosque of Asilah is located inside the former kasbah (citadel), at the eastern end of the medina. It was built soon after the city was retaken at the end of the 17th century.

Moulay Ismail charged the new governor of Tangier, Ali ibn Abdallah Errifi, with building the mosque; however, it's possible that it was his son, Ahmed Errifi, who actually carried out the construction.

It has an octagonal minaret, a feature common to some parts of northern Morocco but not in the rest of the country. With its whitewashed walls and minaret, its decoration is quite plain compared to other mosques built by the Errifis at the same time (such as the Kasbah Mosque in Tangier). Like other Moroccan mosques, it is open to Muslims only.

Gallery

See also 
 Asilah
 Kasbah Mosque
 List of mosques in Morocco

References 

Buildings and structures in Tanger-Tetouan-Al Hoceima
Mosques in Morocco